The 1951 All-Southern Conference football team consists of American football players chosen by the Associated Press (AP) and United Press (UP) for the All-Southern Conference football team for the 1951 college football season.

All-Southern Conference selections

Backs
 Ed Modzelewski, Maryland (AP-1, UP-1)
 Gil Bocetti, Washington & Lee (AP-1, UP-1)
 Ed Mioduszewski, William & Mary (AP-1)
 Steve Wadiak, South Carolina (AP-1)
 Billy Hair, Clemson (UP-1)
 John Berry, William & Mary (UP-1)

Ends
 Glenn Smith, Clemson (AP-1, UP-1)
 Jack Lewis, Wake Forest (AP-1)
 Neal Petree, VMI (UP-1)

Tackles
 Elmer Costa, North Carolina State (AP-1, UP-1)
 Bill George, Wake Forest (AP-1)
 John Kreamcheck, William & Mary (UP-1)

Guards
 Bob Ward, Maryland (AP-1, UP-1)
 Joe Dudeck, North Carolina (AP-1, UP-1)

Centers
 Larry Smith, South Carolina (AP-1, UP-1)

Key
AP = Associated Press

UP = United Press

See also
1951 College Football All-America Team

References

All-Southern Conference football team
All-Southern Conference football teams